Madame Aema 4 (애마부인 4 - Aema Buin 4) is a 1990 South Korean film directed by Suk Do-won. It was the 4th entry in the Madame Aema series, the longest-running film series in Korean cinema.

Plot
In this entry in the long-running Madame Aema series, Aema's husband becomes romantically involved with a Japanese woman after taking a job at a Japanese company. Aema must also contend with two men who are making romantic advances towards her.

Cast
 Ju Ri-hye: Aema
 Lee Dong-jun: husband
 You Young-kook
 Yoon Ji-won: Erica
 Shin Sung-ha: Moon-ho
 Choe Ho-jin: R.O.T.C.
 Jin Yeo-jin: Yoshiko

Bibliography

English

Korean

Notes

Madame Aema
1990 films
1990s erotic films
1990s Korean-language films
South Korean sequel films